Lucre  usually refers to one of many slang terms for money. It may also refer to:

Lucre District, Quispicanchi, a district in Peru
Lucre, a hill in the novel The Pilgrim's Progress by John Bunyan
Lucre Island, a fictional island in the Monkey Island video-game series

See also
Filthy Lucre (disambiguation)
Luker (disambiguation)